Jhemp Hoscheit (born September 20, 1951 in Esch-sur-Alzette) is a Luxembourgian writer. He won the Servais Prize in 1999 for his book Perl oder Pica.

External links
Biography at the CNL(in Luxembourgish)

1951 births
Living people
Luxembourgian novelists
People from Esch-sur-Alzette
20th-century Luxembourgian writers
Luxembourgian male writers